Polsat Futbol was a sports channel owned by Polsat, which broadcasts football matches and programmes devoted to football. It was Poland's first channel devoted exclusively to one sport.

It was created for the broadcast of the UEFA Europa League (4 additional channels Polsat Futbol).

Polsat Futbol was be replaced by Polsat Sport Extra HD on June 1, 2012.

See also
 Polsat Sport
 Polsat Sport HD

References

External links
 Official site sport of Polsat

Polsat
Sports television in Poland
Defunct television channels in Poland
Television channels and stations established in 2009
Television channels and stations disestablished in 2012